Du côté d'Orouët is a 1973 French film directed by Jacques Rozier. The film is about three young girls who have their summer vacation in a villa on the beaches of Orouët. It was first screened at the Cannes Film Festival in 1971.

Cast
Danièle Croisy as Joëlle
Françoise Guégan as Kareen
Caroline Cartier as Caroline
Bernard Ménez as Gilbert
Patrick Verde as Patrick

References

External links
 

French drama films
1970 films
1970s French-language films
1970s French films